Juan Navarro Reverter (27 January 1844, in Valencia, Spain – 2 April 1924, in Madrid, Spain) was a Spanish historian and politician who served as Minister of State between 1912 and 1913.

Economy and finance ministers of Spain
Foreign ministers of Spain
Members of the Royal Spanish Academy
1844 births
1924 deaths
Liberal Party (Spain, 1880) politicians
Civil governors of Madrid